The 2005–2006 UCI Track Cycling World Cup Classics is a multi race tournament over a season of track cycling. The season ran from November 4, 2005, to May 16, 2006. The World Cup is organised by the UCI.

Results

Men

Women

References
Round 1, Moscow Results
Round 2, Manchester Results
Round 3, Carson Results
Round 4, Sydney Results

World Cup Classics

UCI Track Cycling World Cup